Evelyn Rose de Lacy (21 November 1917 – 27 June 2004), also known by her married name Evelyn Whillier, was an Australian freestyle swimmer. As a 16-year-old on 18 December 1933 she set a Western Australian state record in the 100-yard freestyle race at Crawley Baths. She later competed in the 1936 Summer Olympics and was eliminated in the semi-finals of the 100-metre freestyle event.  In the 400-metre freestyle, she was eliminated in the first round. At the 1938 Empire Games she won the gold medal in the 110-yard freestyle contest. She was also a member of the Australian relay teams that won the silver medal in the 4×110-yard freestyle event and the bronze medal in the 3×110-yard medley competition.

References

1917 births
2004 deaths
Olympic swimmers of Australia
Swimmers at the 1936 Summer Olympics
Swimmers at the 1938 British Empire Games
Commonwealth Games gold medallists for Australia
Commonwealth Games silver medallists for Australia
Commonwealth Games bronze medallists for Australia
Swimmers from Perth, Western Australia
Commonwealth Games medallists in swimming
Australian female freestyle swimmers
20th-century Australian women
Medallists at the 1938 British Empire Games